James Brydges, 8th Baron Chandos (1642–1714) was an English Ambassador to the Ottoman Empire.

He was the son of Sir John Brydges, 2nd Baronet and  Mary Pearle. A graduate of St John's College, Oxford Brydges became 3rd Baronet, of Wilton, Herefordshire in 1651 and 8th Baron Chandos of Sudeley in 1686 following the death of his third cousin, William Brydges, 7th Baron Chandos.

Lord Chandos had connections with the Levant Company, for example through his father-in-law Sir Robert Barnard, who was a merchant. The Levant Company controlled the appointment of the British ambassador in Constantinople, and although Charles II had some reservations about his politics, Chandos was elected by the Company on 22 April 1680. Royal Instructions were issued on 29 December. Lord Chandos arrived in Constantinople as the ambassador on 22 July 1681. Having served for only three years, he was recalled in November 1684. He left Turkey in October 1687. At this time, the Ottoman Empire was making great advances into Europe, reaching the walls of Vienna.

He served as High Sheriff of Herefordshire in 1667.

He married Elizabeth Barnard and was the father of James Brydges, 1st Duke of Chandos, famous as the employer of Handel and friend of Alexander Pope; his daughter, The Hon. Mary Brydges, who married Theophilus Leigh, was the great-grandmother of Jane Austen.

References 

1642 births
1714 deaths
Alumni of St John's College, Oxford
Ambassadors of England to the Ottoman Empire
18th-century English people
High Sheriffs of Herefordshire
17th-century English diplomats
Ja
8